Sunstorm may refer to:

Sunstorm (novel), a 2005 novel by Arthur C. Clarke and Stephen Baxter.
Sun Storm, a 2003 Swedish novel by Åsa Larsson
Sunstorm Interactive, a former video game company
Sunstorm (Transformers), a character from the Transformers universe
Sunstorm (band), a hard rock project
Sunstorm (Sunstorm album), 2006
Sunstorm (John Stewart album), 1972
Geomagnetic storm, a storm caused by solar wind